Charlie "Chili" Altemose (June 3, 1913 – January 26, 1995 in Bethlehem, Pennsylvania) was a U.S. soccer player who was a member of the U.S. soccer team at the 1936 Summer Olympics.  He also played twelve seasons in the American Soccer League.

Altemose grew up in Bethlehem, Pennsylvania where his father died in 1924.  In 1935, he joined the Philadelphia German-Americans of the American Soccer League.  In 1936, Altemose and his teammates won the 1936 National Challenge Cup.  He later played for Brooklyn Hispano and finished his career with the Philadelphia Nationals in 1947.  In 1936, he was selected for the U.S. team at the 1936 Summer Olympics.  Altemose and his teammates played one game, a 1-0 loss to Italy.

References

External links

1913 births
1995 deaths
American soccer players
Brooklyn Hispano players
Olympic soccer players of the United States
Footballers at the 1936 Summer Olympics
American Soccer League (1933–1983) players
Uhrik Truckers players
Philadelphia Nationals players
Soccer players from Pennsylvania
Sportspeople from Bethlehem, Pennsylvania
Association football midfielders